Ann Bamford (c.17801863) was a prominent slavery abolitionist in New Hampshire in the mid 1800s.

Biography
Ann Bamford was an Irish immigrant who emigrated to Canada before moving on to the United States with her husband. She was responsible for getting at least 42 enslaved people into Canada between 1842 and 1858 as part of the Underground Railroad. She lived in Manchester, New Hampshire, and is believed to have hidden the people in her home for several days at a time.

In her old age she lived with her daughter and son in law and was buried in Piscataquog Cemetery. Her work was mostly forgotten until members of the African community sent a query to a local newspaper, the Mirror and American, in October 1902 looking for information about her. There was a follow up the following day triggered by the lack of awareness of her work by those who knew her. She is now remembered through a plaque erected at 860 Elm Street near her home on Manchester Street as part of Black History Month in 2022.

Sources

1780 births
1863 deaths
Underground Railroad people
19th-century Irish people
Activists from New Hampshire
American abolitionists
People from Manchester, New Hampshire
Irish emigrants to the United States (before 1923)